M. Duraiswamy (born 22 September 1960) is an Indian Judge. He is former Acting Chief Justice of Madras High Court.

References 

1960 births
Living people
Indian judges